John Jones Clarke (February 24, 1803 – November 25, 1887) was an American politician, who served in both branches of the Massachusetts legislature and as the first Mayor of Roxbury, Massachusetts in 1846.

References 
A Catalogue of the City Councils of Boston, 1822-1908, Roxbury, 1846-1867, Charlestown 1847-1873 and of The Selectmen of Boston, 1634-1822 also of Various Other Town and Municipal officers, Boston, MA: City of Boston Printing Department, 1909, p. 327.
 History of the First Church in Roxbury, Massachusetts, 1630-1904 By Walter Eliot Thwing (1908).
 The Memorial History of Boston: Including Suffolk County, Massachusetts. 1630-1880. Justin Winsor (1881).

Notes

1803 births
1887 deaths
Harvard College alumni
Phillips Academy alumni
Members of the Massachusetts House of Representatives
Massachusetts state senators
Mayors of Roxbury, Massachusetts
People from Norton, Massachusetts
19th-century American politicians